Nirapara is a brand of rice and spice powders manufactured by the KKR Group. The brand evolved from the K.K.R Mills which was established by K.K.R Karnan in Kerala in 1976. The company has been recently acquired by Wipro Consumer Care.

History
KKR Group was established by K. K. Karnan in the year 1976 as a small scale rice mill factory located in the town of Okkal in Kalady, near Kochi. K. K. Karnan later expanded this venture into a modern rice processing mill. Rice varieties, spice powders, ready-to-eat and other food products manufactured by the company were all brought under one name, making Nirapara a food brand in South India. Nirapara products are exported from Kerala and are available in 32 other countries including the US, the UK, Canada, Far East and West Asia.

Products 
Nirapara manufactures a wide range of products; their main specialties are rice, wheat flour products, and spice powders. include pickles, tava products, frozen foods, especially for exporting, and ready-to-eat items.

Rice
Different rice varieties are dried, separated from the husk and subjected to processing before being packaged. Rice varieties include matta rice, idly rice, ponni rice, surekha, jaya rice, cherumani, single boiled, and jeerakasala rice among others.

Wheat flour products 
Nirapara flour products include a wide variety of traditional Kerala rice and wheat flour products used for making traditional foods such as chappathi, upma, appam, palappam, puttu, idly, and dosa idiyappam etc.

Spices and curry powders 
To make the preparation of Indian curries easier, Nirapara launched the Nirapara Curry Masala brand with spices and curry powders that are processed and packaged for distribution.

Controversy 
KKR Group faced a controversy in September 2015, when the food safety commissioner banned the manufacture, sale, and distribution of the Nirapara chilli, turmeric, and coriander powder under the provisions of the Food Safety and Standards Act of India, as the authorities found added starch in the spice powders.

In October 2015, the Kerala High Court on Tuesday set aside the ban by the Food Safety Commissioner, as the samples were not found harmful for human consumption. In the absence of any harmful content, the court withdrew the ban imposed on the said spice powders facilitating its manufacture, sale, and distribution.

References

External links
 

Companies based in Kochi
Indian companies established in 1976
Food and drink companies established in 1976
Food and drink companies of India
Starch companies
Rice production in India
Multinational companies headquartered in India
Privately held companies of India
1976 establishments in Kerala